The short-furred Atlantic tree-rat or Wagner's Atlantic tree rat (Phyllomys unicolor), is a spiny rat species found in Brazil.

References

Phyllomys
Mammals described in 1842